Microlaena is a genus of flowering plant in the family Poaceae, native to from Java through Australia to New Zealand. The genus was established by Robert Brown in 1810.

Species
, Plants of the World Online accepted three species:
Microlaena connorii Renvoize
Microlaena stipoides (Labill.) R.Br.
Microlaena tasmanica (Hook.f.) Hook.f. ex Benth.

References

Oryzoideae 
Poaceae genera
Taxa named by Robert Brown (botanist, born 1773)